Conkers is a traditional children's game in Great Britain and Ireland played using the seeds of horse chestnut trees—the name 'conker' is also applied to the seed and to the tree itself.  The game is played by two players, each with a conker threaded onto a piece of string: they take turns striking each other's conker until one breaks.

Origins
The first mention of the game is in Robert Southey's memoirs published in 1821.  He describes a similar game, but played with snail shells or hazelnuts.  It was only from the 1850s that using horse chestnuts was regularly referred to in certain regions.  The game grew in popularity in the 19th century, and spread beyond England.

The first recorded game of Conkers using horse chestnuts was on the Isle of Wight in 1848.

There is uncertainty of the origins of the name.  The name may come from the dialect word conker, meaning "knock out" (perhaps related to French conque meaning a conch, as the game was originally played using snail shells and small bits of string.) The name may also be influenced by the verb conquer, as earlier games involving shells and hazelnuts have also been called conquerors. Another possibility is that it is an onomatopoeia, representing the sound made by a horse chestnut as it hits another hard object, such as a skull (another children's "game", also called conkers, consists of simply throwing the seeds at one another over a fence or wall). Conkers are also known regionally as cheesers, a "cheeser" being a conker with one or more flat sides, which comes about due to it sharing its pod with other conkers (twins or triplets). Also Cheggers was used in Lancaster, England in the 1920s.  In D. H. Lawrence's book Sons and Lovers, the game is referred to as cobblers by William Morel.

Game

 A hole is drilled in a large, hard conker using a nail, gimlet, small screwdriver, or electric drill. A piece of string (often a shoelace is used), about 20 cm (8 inches) long, is threaded through it.  A large knot at one or both ends of the string secures the conker.
 The game is played between two people, each with a conker.
 They take turns hitting each other's conker using their own. One player lets the conker dangle on the full length of the string while the other player swings their conker and hits.

Scoring
 A conker gains one point for surviving a hit that causes the other one to break. The point is scored whether the surviving conker was attacking or defending at the time.
 A new conker is a none-er, meaning that it has not defeated any others yet and thus has no score.
 As a conker accumulates points, its designation changes to reflect the total: a none-er becomes a one-er, then a two-er, and so on. In some areas of Scotland, conker victories are counted using the terms bully-one, bully-two, etc.  In some areas of the United States and Canada, conker victories are counted using the terms one-kinger, two-kinger, etc.
 In some regions, the winning conker receives all the points accumulated by the losing one, in addition to gaining one more point for the defeat. For example, a two-er that defeats a three-er would become a six-er (2 + 3 + 1). Other regions only award one point to the winner, regardless of the loser's score.

Variant rules
 If the strings become entangled, the first player to shout "strings" or "stringsies" has an extra turn.
 If one player drops their conker, the other can shout "stamps" or "stampsies" entitling them to try and break the conker on the ground by stamping on it. Shouting "no stamps" before the other player can shout "stamps" prevents any stamping.

Hardening conkers
The hardest conkers usually win. Hardening conkers is often done by keeping them for a year (aged conkers are called laggies in many areas or seasoners in Ireland and Liverpool), baking them briefly, soaking or boiling in vinegar, or painting with clear nail varnish.  Such hardening is, however, usually regarded as cheating. At the British Junior Conkers Championships on the Isle of Wight in October 2005, contestants were banned from bringing their own conkers due to fears that they might harden them. The Campaign for Real Conkers claimed this was an example of over-regulation which was causing a drop in interest in the game. In both the World Conker Championship and the North American Championship, contestants are also restricted to using the conkers provided by the Organisers.

One factor affecting the strength of a conker is the shape of the hole.  A clean cylindrical hole is stronger, as it has no notches or chips that can begin a crack or split.

Similar game
A similar Puerto Rican game (played with the smaller seed of the jatobá, Hymenaea courbaril) is called gallitos (meaning small roosters or cocks, as in cockfighting). The opponents face each other and the defending gallito is laid in the center of a circle drawn in the dirt. Not until the attacking player misses will the defending player take a turn. Upon missing, if the attacking player is quick enough, they will try to swing at the defending gallito before the defendant removes it from within the circle. If the defending gallito is struck it must remain in the circle until the attacker misses again. This move is called a "paso de paloma".

Championships
In 1965 the World Conker Championships were set up in Ashton (near Oundle) Northamptonshire, England, and still take place on the second Sunday of October every year.  In 2004, an audience of 5,000 turned up to watch more than 500 competitors from all over the world. The 2016 Championship was featured on the BBC programme "Countryfile".

1976 was the first time that a non-British contestant won the Men's World Conker Championship. The Mexican Jorge Ramirez Carrillo took the place of a contestant who was unable to arrive on time at Ashton, and defeated the 1975 champion at the finals. The Men's champion has been British in every other year except 1998, when Helmut Kern from Nauort, Germany, won.

In 1999 the Irish Conker Championships began in Freshford, County Kilkenny in the Republic of Ireland.

2000 saw the first Ladies' champion from outside the UK. Selma Becker, originally from Austria, took the title. The title of Queen of Conkers has remained in the UK, except in 2001 when Frenchwoman Celine Parachou won.

2001 Eamonn Dooley from Freshford in Co. Kilkenny, Ireland broke the world record by smashing 306 conkers in one hour.

In 2004 an alternative World Conker Championships was first hosted at Pill Harriers Rugby Club, Newport, Wales. This championship, known as the World Annual National Conker Championships, has been held every year since and is sanctioned by Dogfish Promotions. Contestants from the United States, Italy, England and Wales have taken part.

North America

Conkers was played during the late 1940s and early 1950s in New York in the Flatbush section of Brooklyn, and in the 1950s and early 1960s in the amalgamated section of the Bronx and nearby Mt.Vernon. A winning chestnut was referred to as a "killer" and the value of a chestnut was defined by its number of "kills." It was also played in Queens, the upper West Side of Manhattan, in the Mohawk Valley area of upstate New York and in Westmount, Quebec and other English-speaking parts of Montreal into the 1970s. It was played in the Catholic areas of North Cambridge, MA in the late 1950s, and a winning chestnut was also labeled a "killer". It was being played in the 1960s in Rhode Island. and into the early 1980s in Smithfield, RI.

The game was also played in Leicester, Massachusetts in the late 1970s and into the 1980s (and presumably much earlier, given the town's age and predominantly English/Irish settlers) by the children of the Primary School of the town (typically 4th and 5th graders). Leicester's seat of government ("town hall") was a dual use building, serving as both town hall and school. There is a large horse chestnut tree located on the town's common (and adjacent to town hall) that was used as a source for the chestnuts.  The Leicester variant on the name for the game was "Horse Cobblers"(presumably a variant of "Horse Conkers").The North American Conker Championship was inaugurated on 20 October 2012 at the Historic Gardens in the town of Annapolis Royal, Nova Scotia, Canada, hosted by the Annapolis Royal Conker Club.

The first North American Conker Champion was Jeff Hafting, of Annapolis Royal, NS. Ryan Scranton of Granville Beach, NS, was the runner-up. The 2013 North American Championship was similarly held on the third Saturday, 19 October, and the eventual winner of an all-female final was Krystyna Schulz of Halifax, NS.  The winner of the 2014 North American Championship was Julian Smith of Yarmouth, NS.

In 2015 the Championship took place on 17 October, once more hosted at the Historic Gardens in Annapolis Royal. The coveted Crofton Chalice was almost regained by Jeff Hafting, the inaugural 2012 Champion, but he lost in the Final to Simon Bonnington of Granville Ferry, NS. This saw the return of the trophy to its home in Annapolis Royal.

In the 2016 final Elizabeth Mount of Bear River, NS, beat Oliver Bonnington, son of the 2015 Champion.  The 2017 final was a re-match between Mount and Bonnington, with Mount becoming the first North American Champion to retain the title for a second year in a row.

In the 2018 Championship on 13 October, Mount was eliminated in the first round; the eventual Champion that year was Amanda Carson of Kingston, NS, who defeated Rikarda Albright.

Carson was eliminated in the second round the following year, and the 2019 final saw Spike Sprague of Granville Ferry, NS, pitted against his mother, Georgette Sprague. Georgette, from Petitcodiac, New Brunswick, was the victor when Spike's chestnut shattered on delivering a powerful blow.

Safety concerns
In 2000 a survey of British schools by Keele University showed that many were not allowing children to play conkers, as head teachers were afraid of the legal consequences if children were injured while playing the game, or because they thought that the conkers might be used as weapons. The TV programme Top Gear later staged a game of conkers using caravans suspended from cranes. After putting on safety goggles, presenter James May commented "I now feel perfectly happy about being hit in the face by a caravan." Top Gear, along with other media commentators, wrongly stated that the wearing of goggles during the game was due to an official Health and Safety Executive (HSE) edict when it was in fact due to a myth which started when a headmaster bought goggles for children to use as a parody of health and safety regulation and sponsored a Conkers tournament.

In 2004, several schools banned conkers due to fear of causing anaphylactic shock in pupils with nut allergies.  Health advisers said that there were no known dangers from conkers for nut-allergy sufferers, although some may experience a mild rash through handling them.

See also
 Egg tapping, a similar game with eggs

References

External links
 British Library Playtimes An interview about conkers recorded in 1970 by Iona Opie
 

Children's games
Autumn traditions